Geoffrey Charles Munn, OBE, MVO, FSA, FLS (born in Hastings on 11 April 1953) is a British jewellery specialist, television presenter and writer. He is best known as one of the experts on the BBC's Antiques Roadshow.

Career
Munn's first television appearance was in 1963 when he, and his brother, Roger Munn, featured with their pet fox cubs on Johnny Morris's Animal Magic. He was brought up in Henfield in Sussex and educated at Shoreham College and Steyning Grammar School.

Munn became the managing director of London jewellers Wartski, where he had worked since the age of 19; his specialisation is jewellery, especially that of Fortunato Pio Castellani, Carlo Giuliano and Peter Carl Fabergé. Wartski are jewellers by appointment to HM the Queen and HRH Prince of Wales. The firm made the Welsh gold wedding rings for the Prince of Wales and Camilla Parker Bowles, and Catherine Middleton when she married Prince William in 2011.

Munn has a keen interest in every aspect of history and has a collection of ancient flint tools he has found in the Southwold area of Suffolk. He has appeared in several television sequences of "mudlarking" in the Thames at Westminster. Munn is fascinated by both literature and art and has written a number of books, including Southwold, an Earthly Paradise, a pictorial history of his home town. (Antique Collectors' Club 2006, revised and republished 2017). He has written on the work of D G Rossetti, Edward Lear, J.M.W. Turner and Richard Dadd. Geoffrey Munn is a trustee of the Bethlem Museum of the Mind. In July 2015, he conducted the first in a series called Tate Britain BP Walks Through British Art in which there was an emphasis on jewellery and botanical decoration from the Renaissance to the present day.

Munn has curated many exhibitions, including Tiaras at the Victoria and Albert Museum in 2002. He is a Fellow of the Society of Antiquaries, the Linnean Society of London and The Royal Society of Arts. Munn is a Freeman of the City of London and was Fourth Warden of the Worshipful Company of Goldsmiths. He is also a member of the Garrick Club, The Arts Club, the Academy Club and the Sailor's Reading Room, Southwold.

Munn is the author of four books about jewellery: Castellani and Giuliano: revivalist jewellers of the nineteenth century (Office du Livre 1984), Artist's Jewellery; Pre-Raphaelite to Arts and Crafts with Charlotte Gere (Antique Collectors' Club 1989), The Triumph of Love: jewellery 1530–1930 (Thames and Hudson 1993), Tiaras: a history of splendour (Antique Collectors' Club, 2003). Geoffrey Munn has also written a history of his firm called "Wartski- The First One Hundred and Fifty Years" (Antique Collectors' Club 2015). He has also made a survey of the work of the contemporary Italian jeweller and goldsmith Giovanni Corvaja.

Munn was appointed Officer of the Order of the British Empire (OBE) in the 2013 New Years Honours list for services to charity in the United Kingdom. In 2016 Geoffrey Munn was appointed Chairman of the Friends of The British Antique Dealers' Association Trust. In 2018 he was made a Member of the Royal Victorian Order by the Queen.

Personal life
Munn married Caroline in 1983 and the couple have two sons. The couple live near Southwold in Suffolk.

In Who's Who he lists his recreations as "mudlarking", metal detecting, Bonsai, cooking, museums and art galleries. He played himself in Joe's Palace, a film by Stephen Poliakoff.
Munn is also an Ambassador for the Samaritans and patron of the Lowestoft branch; he ran the Flora London Marathon for the charity raising £80,000 in sponsorship. He is also an Ambassador for the charity Pancreatic Cancer UK and patron of The Brain Tumour Charity, the Royal Osteoporosis Society and Sotterley Chapel Preservation Trust.

References

Living people
Antiques experts
British television presenters
1953 births
People educated at Steyning Grammar School
Commanders of the Order of the British Empire
Fellows of the Society of Antiquaries of London
Fellows of the Linnean Society of London
People from Henfield
People from Hastings